Biyuram Wahge (born 1965) is an Indian politician from Arunachal Pradesh. He is a member of the Bharatiya Janata Party and the president of state's BJP unit. He is a member of the Arunachal Pradesh Legislative Assembly representing Pakke-Kessang constituency.

Personal life 
Wahge was born in 1965 to Tali Wahge in Seba village of East Kameng district, Arunachal Pradesh. He finished his schooling in two different towns, Seppa and Bomdila, and eventually settled at Seijosa, Pakke-Kessang district. His elder brother, Katung Wahge, is the Chief Engineer of Western Zone of Public Works Department, Government of Arunachal Pradesh.

Political career 
Wahge is a member of the Bharatiya Janata Party (BJP) and is active in the politics of Arunachal Pradesh. He embarked on a career in politics after joining the youth wing of the BJP, Bharatiya Janata Yuva Morcha (BJYM), in 2000 and held various positions in the organisation till 2008. He was the state general secretary of the BJYM from 2000 to 2003 and became its vice-president in 2003 and remained in this capacity till 2005. He became the president of the BJYM in 2005 and held this position till 2008 when he left the organisation for the parent body and became the treasurer of the latter. He was promoted to the rank of state general secretary of the BJP in 2014.

Member of the Legislative Assembly 
In the 2017 Arunachal Pradesh Legislative Assembly by-election, Wahge was given a BJP ticket to contest from Pakke-Kessang Vidhan Sabha constituency. Bypoll to this constituency was necessitated following the rejection of Indian National Congress politician and the former Deputy Chief Minister of Arunchal Pradesh Kameng Dolo's plea by the Supreme court against a judgement of the Guwahati High Court declaring the election of Dolo in the 2014 Arunachal Pradesh Legislative Assembly election void. Dolo also contested the bypoll from the same constituency but lost against Wahge.

He was again entrusted by the party from Pakke-Kessang to contest the 2019 Arunachal Pradesh Legislative Assembly election. He defeated the Congress candidate Atum Welly by a margin of 2,222 votes. He donated his first salary as a member of the Arunachal Pradesh Legislative Assembly to the party's state unit fund, becoming
the first legislator in the history of Arunachal Pradesh to do so.

BJP Arunachal Pradesh president 
Wahge was elected as the president of the state unit of the BJP, BJP Arunachal Pradesh, on 17 January 2020 at Itanagar, succeeding Tapir Gao. The election process was carried out under the supervision of party's returning officer for the organisational elections in the state, Roding Pertin. He received the certification of his election to the position of the president in the party's state organisational structure by the National General Secretary of the BJP, Anil Jain, in the presence of party's central election observer for the election of president in the state Vinod Sonkar, Education Minister Taba Tedir, Rural Works Department Minister Honchun Ngandam and other legislators and senior leaders of the state BJP.

References 
 

Living people
1965 births
Bharatiya Janata Party politicians from Arunachal Pradesh
People from East Kameng district
Arunachal Pradesh MLAs 2014–2019
Arunachal Pradesh MLAs 2019–2024